The 1970–71 Lancashire Cup was the fifty-eighth staging of the tournament. Leigh won the trophy by beating St. Helens by the score of 7–4 in the final. The match was played at Station Road, Pendlebury, (historically in the county of Lancashire). The attendance was 10,776 and receipts were £3,136.

Background 

The total number of teams entering the competition remained the same at a total of 16. Once again two junior (or amateur) clubs were invited St Helens Amateurs and this year, Whitehaven Amateurs.
The same fixture format was retained, and due to the number of participating clubs, resulted in a full fixture list with no byes or “blank” or “dummy” fixtures.

Competition and results

Round 1 
Involved  8 matches (with no bye or “blank” fixture) and 16 clubs

Round 1 replays 
Involved  1 match and 2 clubs

Round 2 - Quarter-finals 
Involved 4 matches (with no bye) and 8 clubs

Round 2 – replays  
Involved 1 match and 2 clubs

Round 3 – Semi-finals  
Involved 2 matches and 4 clubs

Final

Teams and scorers 
 

Scoring - Try = three (3) points - Goal = two (2) points - Drop goal = two (2) points

The road to success

Notes and comments 
1 * St Helens Amateurs were a junior (or amateur) club from St Helens 
2 * Whitehaven Amateurs are a junior (or amateur) club from Whitehaven 
3 * Station Road was the home ground of Swinton from 1929 to 1932 and at its peak was one of the finest rugby league grounds in the country and it boasted a capacity of 60,000. The actual record attendance was for the Challenge Cup semi-final on 7 April 1951 when 44,621 watched Wigan beat Warrington 3-2

See also 
British rugby league system
1970–71 Northern Rugby Football League season
Rugby league county cups
List of defunct rugby league clubs

References

External links
Saints Heritage Society
1896–97 Northern Rugby Football Union season at wigan.rlfans.com
Hull&Proud Fixtures & Results 1896/1897
Widnes Vikings - One team, one passion Season In Review - 1896-97
The Northern Union at warringtonwolves.org

RFL Lancashire Cup
Lancashire Cup